Langa may refer to:

Places

South Africa
Langa, Cape Town, the oldest township in Cape Town, South Africa
Langa, a township in Uitenhage

Northern Europe
Langa, Estonia, a village in Padise Commune, Harju County, Estonia
Langa, a small river near Riga, Latvia
Länga, a village in Salme Parish, Saare County, Estonia
Langå, a town in Denmark
Langå Municipality, in Denmark
Langa, Shetland, an island off Hildasay, Shetland, Scotland

Southern Europe
Langa, Greece, a village in the southern part of Kastoria
Langa, Ávila, a village in the northern part of the province of Ávila, Community of Castile and León, Spain
 Langa de Duero, a municipality in Castile and León, Spain
 Langa del Castillo, a municipality in Aragon, Spain
Le Langhe, a geographical region of Piedmont, north-west Italy
Lânga, a village in Pielești Commune, Dolj County, Romania

Others
Langa, Iran, a village in Mazandaran Province, Iran
 Bhano Langa, a village in Punjab, India
 Langa District, a district in Peru

People 
Pius Langa (1939–2013), retired Chief Justice of South Africa and judge on the Constitutional Court
Langa KaXaba (died 1805), former king of the Ndwandwe nation of southern Africa
Júlio Duarte Langa (born 1927)
Andrew Langa
Concha Langa
Jonathan Langa (born 1990)
Mandla Langa (born 1950)
Sithembile Langa (born 1995)
Thokozani Langa (born 1972)
Trevor Langa (born 1989)

Other uses 
Langa (garment), a traditional dress of India
Langha (tribe), a tribe from Rajasthan, known for its folk music

See also 
 Lunga (disambiguation)
 Langah (disambiguation)

Mozambican surnames